Our Lady of Mount Carmel Cathedral or Our Lady of Carmel Cathedra may refer to:
Argentina
Our Lady of Carmel Cathedral, Formosa

Benin
Our Lady of Carmel Cathedral, Kandi

Brazil
Our Lady of Carmel Cathedral, Jaboticabal

Costa Rica
Our Lady of Mount Carmel Cathedral, Puntarenas

India
 Mount Carmel Cathedral, Allahabad
 Mount Carmel Cathedral, Alappuzha

Indonesia
Cathedral of Our Lady of Mount Carmel, Malang 

Northern Mariana Islands
Our Lady of Mount Carmel Cathedral (Chalan Kanoa)

Philippines
 Our Lady of Mount Carmel Cathedral, Jolo

United States
St. Mary, Our Lady of Mount Carmel Cathedral (Gaylord, Michigan)

See also
Our Lady of Mount Carmel Catholic Church (disambiguation)
 Our Lady of Mount Carmel Church